Twins are two offspring produced in the same pregnancy.

Twins may also refer to:

Arts, entertainment and media

Fictional characters
 Twins (The Matrix)
 The Twins (Transformers)
 Leonel and Marco Salamanca, Breaking Bad and Better Call Saul characters referred to as "The Twins"
 The Twins, or Spazmatism and Retinazer, a pair of bosses in the video game Terraria

Films
 The Twins (1923 film), an Australian silent film
 Twins (1925 film), an American comedy film starring Stan Laurel
 Twins (1988 film), an American comedy film starring Arnold Schwarzenegger and Danny DeVito
 The Twins (2005 film), a South Korean film
 The Twin (2022 film), a psychological horror film

Literature
 Twins (novel), a 2006 young adult novel by Marcy Dermansky
 Twins, a 1977 novel by Jack Geasland and Bari Wood, based on the story of Stewart and Cyril Marcus
 Twins, a series of 26 children's books by Lucy Fitch Perkins
 Twins, a 1999 photobook by Steven Underhill
 The Twins (Loo novel), by Tessa de Loo, 1993
 The Twins (1930 novel), a novel by Abd Al Quddus Al Ansari
 "The Twins", a poem by Henry Sambrooke Leigh (1837–1883)
 Twins: A Variety Store Named "The End of the World", a novel by Novala Takemoto
 "The Twins" (Albanian tale), a folktale

Music

Bands
 Twins (group), a Hong Kong Cantopop duo
 The Twins (Australian duo), an EDM and house group
 The Twins, twin sisters who performed together as actresses and as a dance/pop duo in the 1990s, Gayle and Gillian Blakeney
 The Twins (German duo), a synth-pop and Eurodisco group
 TWiiNS, a Slovak pop group
 Twinz, an American hip hop duo

Albums
 Twins (By2 album), 2009
 Twins (In the Nursery album) or the title song, 1986
 Twins (Ornette Coleman album), 1971
 Twins (Super Junior album) or the title song (see below), 2005
 Twins (Ty Segall album), 2012
 Twins (2001 EP), by Twins 
 Twins (2002 EP), by Twins

Songs
 "Twins" (Philip Bailey and Little Richard song), from the 1988 film
 "Twins (Knock Out)", by Super Junior, 2005
 "Twins", by Gem Club, 2011
 "Twins", by Maritime from We, the Vehicles, 2005

Television
 Twins (TV series), a 2005 American sitcom
 The Twins (1979 TV series), a Hong Kong television series

Science and technology
 TWINS (Two Wide-Angle Imaging Neutral-Atom Spectrometers), a NASA program
 Temperature and Winds for InSight (TWINS), a meteorological suite onboard InSight Mars lander
 Twins, in crystal twinning

Sports
 LG Twins, a Korean baseball team
 Minnesota Twins, an American baseball team
 Thunder Bay Twins, a defunct Canadian hockey Team
 Thunder Bay K&A Twins, a defunct Canadian hockey Team

Other uses 
 Gimmigela Chuli, or The Twins, a mountain in the Himalayas

See also

 Gemini (disambiguation)
 The Twin (disambiguation)
 Twin (disambiguation)
 Twin Sisters (disambiguation)
 Twin Towers (disambiguation)